Grebel is a German surname. Notable people with the surname include:

Conrad Grebel (c. 1498 – 1526), Swiss merchant and Anabaptist
Eva Grebel (born 1966), German astronomer
24749 Grebel, main-belt asteroid

See also 
Gräbel
Griebel

German-language surnames